"Let's Get Excited" is a song performed by English singer-songwriter Alesha Dixon. It is the third single from her second studio album, The Alesha Show, released by Asylum Records. The song has been added to BBC Radio 1's A-List. The single was the second single taken from "The Alesha Show" in most countries.

Background
"Let's Get Excited" was written by Dixon, Kuk Harrell, Sean Hall and Todd Herfinda and is an up-tempo dance track. After writing with Dixon, Harrell and Sean K produced the song on behalf of RedZone Entertainment, the company which he is managed by. Harrell was also the song's vocal producer and engineer.

Lyrically, the song namechecks Madonna, and makes a reference to "Into the Groove", a 1985 Madonna song. Dixon later stated that "Growing up Madonna was my idol and I loved dressing up like her and so she has definitely been a big influence on my career".

Promotion
Alesha performed the song live at the following events:
 The Nokia Green Room - 19 December 2008
 The Feelgood Factor - 23 February 2009
 Let's Dance for Comic Relief - 14 March 2009
 The Paul O'Grady Show - 5 May 2009
 Tonight's the Night - 9 May 2009
 Radio 1's Big Weekend - 10 May 2009
 Guinness World Records Smashed - 10 May 2009
 Loose Women - 14 May 2009

Music video

The video, directed by Max & Dania was shot in three days, starting on 26 March 2009.

The video is set in an East London nightclub surrounded by many dancers. Alesha Dixon is wearing black leggings and gold shoes and has her hair in a high-black ponytail. The entire video is set in the club but there is a variety of different looks and scenes going on. Near the end of the video everyone in the club is soaked with hoses.

The video was televised on Tuesday 7 April on 4Music at 7:00pm, and on terrestrial TV on Wednesday 8 April on Channel 4 at 00:05AM. The video premiered, along with the single cover on Dixon's website on 8 April 2009.

Reception
Digital Spy
Give the past eight years of Alesha Dixon's career a dusting over and it's clear she's experienced more highs and lows than your average day out at Thorpe Park. However, over the past six months she's been unstoppable - largely because she's released exactly the right songs from her Alesha Show album. Catching our attention with the novelty-ish 'The Boy Does Nothing', she followed it up by showcasing her thoughtful side on 'Breathe Slow'. Now she's back and pulling her finest trick out from under her sleeve. Just in time (hopefully) for summer, 'Let's Get Excited' is a perfect slice of exuberant electro R&B that's sure to fill the dancefloor after a day spent lounging on the beach. With a ridiculously catchy chorus punctuated by a classic Dixon "hey hey hey", it's topped off with one of the year's most genius lyrics so far: "I'm so excited - I'm a detective I'm all over you." Just begging to be played at full volume across the land, this is further evidence that Alesha Dixon is fast becoming a bit of a national treasure.

Track listing

 UK CD single / UK 2-Track Promo CD
 "Let's Get Excited (Redzone Radio Mix)"
 "Let's Get Excited (Album Version)"
 UK Maxi Single (Exclusive to Dixon's website, featuring a fold-out poster)
 "Let's Get Excited (Album Version)"
 "Let's Get Excited (Redzone Radio Mix)"
 "Let's Get Excited (Guena LG Glam As You Club Mix)"
 "Let's Get Excited (Guena LG Glam As You Dub Mix)"
 "Let's Get Excited (Blame Remix)"
 UK 7-Track Promo CD
 "Let's Get Excited (Guena LG Remix)"
 "Let's Get Excited (Guena LG Remix) [Edit]"
 "Let's Get Excited (Blame Remix)"
 "Let's Get Excited (Blame Remix) [Edit]"
 "Let's Get Excited (Redzone Radio Mix)"
 "Let's Get Excited (Redzone Instrumental)"
 "Let's Get Excited (Album Version)"

 UK Digital Download
 "Let's Get Excited (Redzone Radio Mix)"
 UK iTunes Digital EP
 "Let's Get Excited (Redzone Radio Mix)"
 "Let's Get Excited (Guena LG Glam As You Club Mix)"
 "Let's Get Excited (Blame Remix)"
 "Let's Get Excited (Blame Instrumental)"

Credits and personnel

 Vocals: Alesha Dixon
 Audio mixing: Phil Tan
 Guitar: Tim Cansfield

 Producer: Kuk Harrell, Sean K
 Engineer: Kuk Harrell
 Recording studio: Sarm West Studios, London, UK and Studio-Atlantis, Los Angeles, US

Charts

End-of-year charts

Release history

References

Alesha Dixon songs
2009 singles
Songs written by Alesha Dixon
2008 songs
Songs written by Kuk Harrell
Asylum Records singles